Dunlap is a village in Peoria County, Illinois, United States. Its population was 1,386 people as of the 2010 census. Dunlap is part of the Peoria metropolitan area and growth in the city of Peoria is extending towards the village. There are only a handful of businesses in the village's 16 blocks.

History
The town of Dunlap was officially established on June 12, 1871 on 40 acres of land owned by Alva Dunlap. The site of his former home is now occupied by the Prospect United Methodist Church. The town was originally located along the Rock Island Railroad. A post office has been in operation at Dunlap since 1871.

The Dunlap Volunteer Fire Department and Rescue Squad was established in 1899. Police services are provided by the Peoria County Sheriff’s Office. The meeting of the first Dunlap Village Council was on January 7, 1952, and the town petitioned for incorporation on February 19, 1952.  The current Village Hall was built in 1995.

Geography

Demographics

As of the census of 2000, there were 926 people, 337 households, and 270 families residing in the suburb. Dunlap is a suburb of Peoria, IL and it is 15 miles from downtown. The racial makeup of the village was 98.52% White, 0.54% African American, 0.22% Native American, 0.51% Asian, and 0.22% from two or more races. Hispanic or Latino of any race were 1.30% of the population.

There were 337 households, out of which 40.7% had children under the age of 18 living with them, 64.7% were married couples living together, 11.6% had a female householder with no husband present, and 19.6% were non-families. 16.0% of all households were made up of individuals, and 6.5% had someone living alone who was 65 years of age or older. The average household size was 2.75 and the average family size was 3.08.

In the village, the population was spread out, with 27.1% under the age of 18, 9.6% from 18 to 24, 29.9% from 25 to 44, 23.8% from 45 to 64, and 9.6% who were 65 years of age or older. The median age was 35 years. For every 100 females, there were 102.2 males. For every 100 females age 18 and over, there were 92.9 males.

The median income for a household in the village was $56,364, and the median income for a family was $62,000. Males had a median income of $42,083 versus $24,732 for females. The per capita income for the village was $20,407. About 3.1% of families and 6.3% of the population were below the poverty line, including 7.9% of those under age 18 and 12.5% of those age 65 or over.

Education

Schools in Dunlap Community Unit School District 323 include:
Banner Elementary School (K-5)
Dunlap Grade School Grades (K-5)
Dunlap High School Grades (9-12)
Dunlap Middle School Grades (6-8)
Dunlap Valley Middle School Grades (6-8)
Hickory Grove Elementary School Grades (K-5)
Ridgeview Elementary School Grades (K-5)
Wilder-Waite Grade School Grades (K-5)

References

Villages in Peoria County, Illinois
Villages in Illinois
Peoria metropolitan area, Illinois
1871 establishments in Illinois
Populated places established in 1871